Hugh Sutherland may refer to:
 Hugh Sutherland (American football), American football coach
 Hugh Sutherland (ice hockey) (1907–1990), Canadian ice hockey player
 Hugh McKay Sutherland (1843–1926), Canadian politician, lumber merchant and railway promotor